List of MPs elected in the 1774 British general election

This is a list of the 558 MPs or Members of Parliament elected to the 314 constituencies of the Parliament of Great Britain in 1774, the 14th Parliament of Great Britain and their replacements returned at subsequent by-elections, arranged by constituency.



By-elections 
List of Great Britain by-elections (1774–90)

See also
1774 British general election
List of parliaments of Great Britain
Unreformed House of Commons

References

1774
 
1774 in Great Britain
Lists of Members of the Parliament of Great Britain